Bryan Batt (born March 1, 1963) is an American actor best known for his role in the AMC series Mad Men as Salvatore Romano, the closeted art director for the Sterling Cooper agency. Primarily a theater actor, he has had a number of starring roles in movies and television as well. His performance in the musical adaptation of Saturday Night Fever earned him one of New York City's more unusual honors, a caricature at Sardi's.

Early life
Batt was born in New Orleans, Louisiana, the son of Gayle (Mackenroth), an amateur actress, dancer, and civic activist, and John Batt. His family founded and ran the Pontchartrain Beach amusement park.  He attended and graduated from Isidore Newman School (a preparatory school in New Orleans) and Tulane University, where he was a member of Delta Kappa Epsilon fraternity.

Personal life
On September 28, 2014, Batt married his long-time partner Tom Cianfichi, an event planner. Batt and Cianfichi own a home decor and furnishings store, Hazelnut, on Magazine Street in New Orleans.  In 2010, Batt published a memoir about his mother entitled She Ain't Heavy, She's My Mother. She died in December 2010.  In 2011, he published a second book, Big, Easy, Style, which focuses on interior design and home furnishings.

Filmography

Film

Television

Theater
Broadway

Off-Broadway

Regional
 Evita – Che (Carousel Dinner Theater)
 Grease – Kenicke (Darien Dinner Theater)
 Trixie True: Teen Detective – Dick Dickerson (Boston Post Road Stage Co.)
 Romeo and Juliet – Paris (New Orleans Center Stage)
 The Lover – John (New Orleans Center Stage)
 Action – Jeep (New Orleans Center Stage)

Awards and nominations

Bibliography
 She Ain't Heavy, She's My Mother: A Memoir (Random House, 2010), 
 Big, Easy Style (Clarkson Potter Publishers, 2011),

References

External links

 
 
 
 Website for Hazelnut, Batt's store

1963 births
American gay actors
Isidore Newman School alumni
Tulane University alumni
LGBT people from Louisiana
Living people
Male actors from New Orleans
American male film actors
American male television actors
American male voice actors
20th-century American male actors
21st-century American male actors
21st-century American LGBT people